= Banzhang Mountain Tunnel =

Tunnel in China

Coordinates: 22.2503874°N 113.5447927°E

The Banzhang Mountain Tunnel (also known as the Yinbing Road Tunnel) is a tunnel in Zhuhai, China that opened on June 22, 2020 with an official ceremony. Its construction was begun in March 2018, and it has a so-called slow-traffic lane for pedestrians and cyclists. The slow-traffic lane is decorated with paintings on the ceiling depicting clouds in the blue sky. The tunnel is about 1.03 km long and has ventilators to keep the air flowing.
